Eugene Walter McClain (March 25, 1922 – July 7, 1997), nicknamed "Jeep", was an American Negro league infielder in the 1940s.

A native of Boston, Massachusetts, McClain made his Negro leagues debut in 1945 with the Philadelphia Stars. He went on to play for the New York Black Yankees the following season. McClain died in West Philadelphia, Pennsylvania in 1997 at age 75.

References

External links
 and Seamheads
 Eugene Walter 'Jeep' McClain at Negro League Baseball Players Association

1922 births
1997 deaths
New York Black Yankees players
Philadelphia Stars players
Baseball players from Boston
20th-century African-American sportspeople
Baseball infielders